Orgmetsa is a village in Järva Parish, Järva County in northern-central Estonia.

Wooden Orgmetsa fire station was moved to Estonian Open Air Museum in Tallinn.

References

 

Villages in Järva County